The Salhyr or Salgir (Cyrillic: Салгир) is the longest river of the Crimean Peninsula. Its length is 204 km, and its drainage basin is 3,750 km². The average discharge of the water is 2 m³/s.

It is formed in the Chatyr-Dag mountains southeast of Simferopol, passes that town and flows north and increasingly east to reach the Syvash of the Azov Sea. Along the way, the river passes through the North Crimean Canal, previously a large affluent waters from Byuk Karasu River up north Novoivanovka (Nizhnegorsk) . It is mainly used for hydroelectricity and agricultural usage.

References

Rivers of Crimea